Pleasantville station is a commuter rail stop on the Metro-North Railroad's Harlem Line, located in Pleasantville, New York. There is also bus service to the station from Pace University.

History
The New York and Harlem Railroad laid tracks through Pleasantville during the 1840s. Evidence of the existence of Pleasantville station can be found as far back as October 1846. The existing station house was built by the New York Central and Hudson River Railroad in 1905. The station also had freight sidings for the shipping department of the headquarters of Reader's Digest. On December 20, 1956, New York State opened up bids for the elimination of several grade crossings in Pleasantville, though the project was originally planned by New York Central 25 years earlier. The project was expected to cost $3.857 million. The project was finished by 1959.   

As with most of the Harlem Line, the merger of New York Central with Pennsylvania Railroad in 1968 transformed the station into a Penn Central Railroad station. Penn Central's continuous financial despair throughout the 1970s forced them to turn over their commuter service to the Metropolitan Transportation Authority which made it part of Metro-North in 1983.

Station layout
The station has one six-car-long high-level island platform serving trains in both directions.

Bibliography

References

External links
 

Pleasantville Metro-North Station (The SubwayNut)
Former Pleasantville New York Central Railroad Depot image (Dynamic Depot Maps)
 Bedford Road entrance from Google Maps Street View

Metro-North Railroad stations in New York (state)
Railway stations in Westchester County, New York
Former New York Central Railroad stations
1846 establishments in New York (state)
Transportation in Westchester County, New York

Railway stations in the United States opened in 1846